State Highway 62 (SH 62) is a highway located in southeastern Texas. It runs  from SH 73/SH 87 near Orange to an intersection with U.S. Highway 96 (US 96), Business U.S. Highway 96 (US 96 Bus), and Farm to Market Road 1004 (FM 1004) in Buna. SH 62 was established in 1923, and its southern end was extended from US 90 to SH 73/SH 87 in 1962.

Route description
SH 62 begins at SH 73 and SH 87 between Orange and Bridge City. SH 73 is concurrent with SH 62 from the southern terminus to the intersection with Interstate 10 (I‑10) and US 90, where SH 73 ends. SH 62 continues its northward journey past this point, going through Mauriceville and Texla in Orange County, clipping the extreme southwest corner of Newton County, and, in Jasper County, traveling through the small community of Gist and ending at Buna.

History
This route was designated on August 21, 1923, but with its south end at SH 3 (later US 90), replacing SH 8B. On May 1, 1962, FM 406 between US 90 and SH 73 was canceled and combined with SH 62.

Major intersections

References

062
Transportation in Orange County, Texas
Transportation in Jasper County, Texas
Transportation in Newton County, Texas